Beverly Ann Donofrio (born September 23, 1950) is an American memoirist, children's author, and creative writing teacher known for her 1992 best selling memoir, Riding in Cars with Boys. The memoir was adapted into the 2001 film Riding in Cars with Boys, directed by Penny Marshall, with Drew Barrymore portraying Donofrio.

Early life and education 
Donofrio's parents are Italian-American. She was raised in Wallingford, Connecticut and graduated from Lyman Hall High School. Donofrio studied literature at Wesleyan University and earned an MFA from Columbia University.

Career 
Donofrio is a prolific essayist, having published work in numerous anthologies, in The New York Times, The Washington Post Sunday Magazine, The Village Voice, the Los Angeles Times, and in such magazines as Allure, Cosmopolitan, O, The Oprah Magazine, and Marie Claire.

Donofrio has taught writing at New York University and the University of Wyoming, among other institutions. She teaches at the Low Residency MFA Program in Creative Writing at Wilkes University.

Personal life 
Donofrio lives in New York State.

Works

Memoirs
 1992: Riding in Cars with Boys
 2001: Looking for Mary, or the Blessed Mother and Me  
 2013: Astonished, a Story of Evil, Blessings, Grace, and Solace (Viking/Penguin)

Children's books
 2007: Mary and the Mouse, the Mouse and Mary (Random House)
 2008: Thank You, Lucky Stars (Random House)

References

External links 

Official website
San Miguel workshops
Ossabaw Island Writers' Retreat, Savannah, GA
 Essay in The Face in the Mirror: Writers Reflect on Their Dreams of Youth and the Reality of Age 

Living people
Wesleyan University alumni
Columbia University School of the Arts alumni
American children's writers
American autobiographers
Wilkes University faculty
People from Wallingford, Connecticut
1950 births
20th-century American women writers
20th-century American non-fiction writers
21st-century American women writers
American women non-fiction writers
21st-century American non-fiction writers
Women autobiographers
American women academics